Georgios Karagkoutis (alternate spellings: Giorgos, Karagoutis) (born February 15, 1976 in Greece), is a retired Greek professional basketball player. At a height of 2.08 m (6 ft. 10 in.) tall, he could play at both the small forward and power forward positions.

Professional career
Karagkoutis started his career with the Greek club Panionios, at the age of 16. He was a Greek Cup finalist in 1995, and in 1998, he was a FIBA Korać Cup semifinalist with Panionios.

In 1999, Karagkoutis moved to Panathinaikos, and he won the EuroLeague championship with the club in 2000. In the subsequent years, he played with Iraklis (2000–01), Near East (2001–02), and Maroussi. With Maroussi, he finished in second place in the regular season of the Greek League, and he was also a Greek Cup finalist with Maroussi in 2006.

National team career
With the Greek Under-16 junior national team, Karagkoutis won the gold medal at the 1993 FIBA Europe Under-16 Championship. With the Greek Under-19 junior national team, Karagkoutis also won the gold medal at the 1995 FIBA Under-19 World Cup.

Karagkoutis also played with the senior men's Greek national team at the 1998 FIBA World Championship, where Greece finished in 4th place, and at the 1999 FIBA EuroBasket, where Greece also finished in 4th place. He represented Greece 25 times at the senior level, and scored a total of 100 points.

Coaching career
After concluding his playing career, Karagkoutis moved with his wife and two children to Dafnoudi, his wife's hometown, where he became a youth coach for the amateur club Ethnikos Neou Skopou.

References

External links
FIBA Profile
FIBA Europe Profile
EuroCup Profile
Hellenic Federation Profile 
Eurobasket.com Profile

1976 births
Living people
Greek men's basketball players
Greek Basket League players
Iraklis Thessaloniki B.C. players
Panathinaikos B.C. players
Power forwards (basketball)
Near East B.C. players
Maroussi B.C. players
Panionios B.C. players
Small forwards
1998 FIBA World Championship players
Basketball players from Athens